Kukenán, also known as Matawi or Cuquenán, is a tepui in Bolívar State, Guayana Region, Venezuela. It has an estimated surface area of 2185 hectares (equivalent to 21.85 square kilometres).

Kukenán is located in Canaima National Park. Next to Kukenán, to the southeast, is Mount Roraima, a better known tepui. Kukenán is more difficult to climb, so it is ascended much less frequently than Mount Roraima.

Canaima National Park is also home to the highest waterfall in the world, which is located in Auyán Tepui.

Scenery on top of Kukenán provided inspiration for the 2009 film Up.

See also
Gran Sabana

References

Further reading

Kok, P.J.R., R.D. MacCulloch, D.B. Means, K. Roelants, I. Van Bocxlaer & F. Bossuyt (7 August 2012).  Current Biology 22(15): R589–R590.  []

Tepuis of Venezuela
Mountains of Venezuela
Cliffs of Venezuela
Mountains of Bolívar (state)